is a 2013 Japanese drama film directed by Tatsushi Ōmori and based on the Akihabara massacre. It was released on  16 March 2013 in Japan.

Cast
Shingo Mizusawa

Accolades

References

External links
 

2013 drama films
2013 films
Drama films based on actual events
Films directed by Tatsushi Ōmori
Films set in Japan
Japanese drama films
2010s Japanese films